Bartolomeo or Bartolommeo Vivarini (c. 1432c. 1499) was an Italian Renaissance painter, known to have worked from 1450 to 1499.

Biography
Bartolomeo's brother Antonio Vivarini, and his nephew (also possibly his pupil) Alvise Vivarini, were also painters.

He learned oil painting from Antonello da Messina, and is said to have produced, in 1473, the first oil picture done in Venice. Housed in the basilica of San Zanipolo, it is a large altar-piece in nine divisions, representing Augustine and other saints.

Most of his works, however, are in tempera. His outline is always hard, and his colour good; the figures have much dignified and devout expression. As "vivarino" means in Italian a goldfinch, he sometimes drew a goldfinch as the signature of his pictures.  The Getty Museum, Harvard University Art Museums, the Honolulu Museum of Art, the Louvre, the Museum of Fine Arts, Boston,  the National Gallery of Art (Washington D.C.), the National Gallery, London, the New Orleans Museum of Art, the Philadelphia Museum of Art, Pinacoteca Ambrosiana (Milan), Pinacoteca Nazionale di Bologna, Pinacoteca Provinciale di Bari, the Rijksmuseum and the Uffizi are among the public collections holding works by Bartolomeo Vivarini.

Gallery

Notes

External links

Italian Paintings in the Robert Lehman Collection, a collection catalog containing information about Vivarini and his works (see index; plate 94).
Bartolomeo Vivarini at the National Gallery of Art

Italian Renaissance painters
Quattrocento painters
Painters from Venice
1430s births
1490s deaths
Italian male painters
15th-century Italian painters
15th-century Venetian people